Bernardine do Régo (born 1937) is a Beninese diplomat.

Life
Bernardine do Régo was born on 20 August 1937 and educated in Dakar and Paris. She studied at the University of Paris from 1961 to 1963, and at the Institut des hautes études d'Outre-Mer (IHEOM) from 1962 to 1964.
dd
In 1964 she wasd appointed administrative and consular affairs director at the Republic of Dahomey's Ministry of Foreign Affairs. In 1970 she became technical consultant to the Office of the Presidency. After the 1972 Dahomeyan coup d'état she served as a diplomat in France, the United States, and as ambassador to Nigeria. She is in retirement in Cotonou.

References

1937 births
Living people
Beninese women ambassadors
Ambassadors of Benin to Nigeria
University of Paris alumni
École nationale de la France d'Outre-Mer alumni
Beninese expatriates in Senegal
Beninese expatriates in France